Michel Pech (4 June 1946 – 20 September 2012) was a French footballer who played as a midfielder. Pech played for Joinville, Malakoff, Nantes, Avignon and Arles.

References

French footballers
1946 births
2012 deaths
Association football midfielders